Christopher Corvinus or Christopher Hunyadi (8 August 1499 in Bihać – 17 March, 1505) was Prince of Hungary and the last male member of the Hungarian Royal House of Hunyadi.

Life
He was born in Bihać in the year 1499. His father was John Corvinus, an illegitimate son of King Matthias I. His mother was Beatrice de Frangepan, the member of a famous Hungarian noble family. His sister was Elisabeth, fiancee of György Zápolya, King John Zapolya's younger brother. After his father's death in 1504,  he became the head of the Hunyadi family, but soon he died and the royal house was extinct in male line, because he was its last male member. It was rumoured that he had been poisoned. His sister, Elisabeth also died soon without issue. He was buried at the monastery of Lepoglava, beside his father.

Footnotes

Bibliography
Schönherr, Gyula: Hunyadi Corvin János (János Corvinus Hunyadi), Franklin-Társulat, Budapest, 1894 URL: See External Links

External links
Schönherr, Gyula: János Corvinus Hunyadi (1473-1504)

Hunyadi family
1499 births
1505 deaths